Nennur is a village in the Tirupati district, Andhra Pradesh, India. The village is located in the Ramachandrapuram mandal.

References

Villages in Tirupati district